Timur Ildarovich Yunusov (born August 15, 1983), better known by his stage name Timati, is a Russian rapper, singer, record producer, actor, and entrepreneur.

Biography

Early life
Timur Ildarovich Yunusov was born on August 15, 1983, in Moscow to an ethnically mixed family of Tatar father Ildar Vakhitovich Yunusov and Jewish mother Simona Yakovlevna Yunusova (née Chernomorskaya), he also has a younger brother, Artyom. He grew up in a wealthy industrialist family, saying "I have very wealthy parents", but  "I was never spoiled."

He was raised mainly on Mira Avenue in Moscow. His current stage name "Timati" has stuck with him since he was young. Yunusov also lived in Los Angeles for 3 years. At the urgent request of his grandfather, composer and conductor Yakov Chervomorsky, Timur graduated from violin class in music school.  He studied at the Higher School of Economics, finished his third year but left to focus on his music career.  He later became associated with the YPS squad. His first single came out with Konaldo.

Career

He became well known to the Russian community from the music reality show Star Factory 4, but before it he collaborated with Detsl. Member of the group Banda (lit. "Gang") and co-founder of VIP 77. Former owner of B-Club nightclub, the bar Black October and the stores Ё-Life. He is the CEO of his own label called "Black Star Inc". In 2006, was featured in Heat produced by Fyodor Bondarchuk. In 2008, Timati was featured in a Fat Joe song called "Put U Take It", also featuring German rapper Nox and Raul, produced by Scott Storch, which references Jacob Arabo. In 2008 Mario Winans featured Timati in the single "Forever". In the same year, Timati appeared in the comedy film Hitler goes Kaput!. Timati, in 2009, featured Snoop Dogg in the single "Groove On" although some make unverified claims that Snoop Dogg (and also Busta Rhymes) was simply paid for the collaboration.

Michael 'Mike' David is currently Timati's UK producer. He is responsible for Timati's collaborations with foreign artists, such as Snoop Dogg, Busta Rhymes, and Mario Winans, and much of Timati's popularity in the Western world.

In summer 2011 he topped the charts in Luxembourg, Poland, and Romania with the single "Welcome to St. Tropez" vs. DJ Antoine and feat. Kalenna Harper from Diddy – Dirty Money, shortly after being nominated for the best clip in Russia's Capital Moscow with "I'm on You" feat. P Diddy. The clip was created by Timati's old friend and partner Pavel Hoodyakov in the U.S.

In 2016 Timati gave his biggest solo performance to date in the Olympic Stadium in Moscow. The concert was attended by 15,000 people and featured a 3D-installation, a car on stage and other spectacular show elements.

On the night of June 21, 2018 Timati and Egor Kreed held an unauthorized mass event in Moscow on Bolshaya Dmitrovka by staging an impromptu performance right on the roof of a car, which caused a major traffic jam on the street. This action was devoted to the opening of Timati's beauty salon. The next day, lawyer Alexander Khaminsky filed an application to initiate a case on this incident in the Department of the Ministry of Internal Affairs of Tver and the Moscow State Traffic Safety Inspectorate. The court was appointed on August 1, 2018.

In 2021, Timati's music video ''Scandal'' featuring Hanza and Oweek received a nomination at the Berlin Music Video Awards for Best Visual Effects. The VFX company behind the music video is HoodyFX.

Friendship with Ramzan Kadyrov 
Timati calls the Chechen president Ramzan Kadyrov a friend and brother. In 2017, Timati shared an Instagram post of himself posing in Kadyrov's private jet. When anti-corruption activists highlighted this, Timati removed the Instagram post.

Support for Vladimir Putin 
He participated in a political video to support Vladimir Putin during the 2012 Russian presidential election. During the 2018 Russian presidential election, he endorsed and was an official supporter of Vladimir Putin.

During the repression of candidates for the election of the Moscow State Duma, police brutality was used to hold back protestors and Timati collaborated with another rapper "Guf" to make "Москва" (Moscow), a song including the chorus "my best friend is President Putin", dissing the protesters and Russian opposition movement while praising the mayor of Moscow, the Kremlin, and Vladimir Putin and the video amassed 1.48 million dislikes on YouTube, the highest amount for a Russian video on YouTube before Russian rapper MORGENSHTERN broke the record for a music video for song "Pososi". Later, Timati deleted the "Moscow" video due to a "wave of negativity".

On 18 March 2022, Timati sang at Vladimir Putin's Moscow rally celebrating the annexation of Crimea by the Russian Federation from Ukraine and justifying the 2022 Russian invasion of Ukraine.

AliExpress Scandal 
On Timati's merchandise store, Black Star Wear, Timati collaborated with the Russian Army with military-style clothes but users found near identical clothing being sold on Chinese online marketplace AliExpress being rebranded and price gouged on Black Star Wear. Similarly, the wireless earphones also sold on Black Star Wear that were branded as "unique" also were traced back to near identical AliExpress counterparts. Timati then did a brand deal with AliExpress, making a short rap video promoting AliExpress, praising AliExpress for delivery speed and good deals on the website.

Books 
 2008 –  "The Moor" – producer books
 2009 – "Audio of Audi. History of the brand" – Executive audiobooks
  2010 – "Tatar folk tales" – Executive audiobooks
  2012 – "A boy of twelve. Tatar folk tale" – Executive audiobooks
  2012 − "A white serpent. Tatar folk tales" − Executive audiobooks
  2012 − "Kamyr-Batyr. Tatar folk tales" − Executive audiobooks

Business 
Timati has several successful businesses including:
 "Black Star Wear" - clothing line.
 "Black Star Burger" - restaurant opened in 2016 in Moscow, it later became a franchise with several locations such as Los Angeles and Cheljabinsk. The burger restaurant is popular among the youths in Russia.
 "13 by Black Star" - barber shop and a tattoo shop in Moscow.
 "Stars Coffee", taking over the former Starbucks coffees in Russia after the company withdrew due to the Russian invasion of Ukraine.

Concert tours 
2009–2010 – The Boss Tour
2011 – Carrera Tour 2011 [30]
2015 – GTO (with L'One)
2016 – Olimp tour

Discography

Studio albums
Black Star (2006)
The Boss (2009)
SWAGG (2012)
 13 (2013)
  RELOAD (2013)
  Audiokapsula (2014)
  G.T.O. (With L'One) (2015)
Olimp (2016)
Tranzit (2020)
Шипы и Розы (2021)
Banger Mixtape (2021)

Collaboration albums
Noviye Lyudi (New People) (2004) – with Banda
The Album (2006) – with VIP77

Singles

As lead artist 

Others
Forever
Love You
Money in the Bank
Top of the World
Not All About The Money

As featured artist

Awards

Berlin Music Video Awards 

 Best Visual Effect ''Scandal'' - 2021 (nominated)

MTV Russian Music Awards
 Best Hip-Hop Artist – 2007 (nominated)
 Best Hip-Hop Artist – 2008 (nominated)
 Best Artist – 2008 (nominated)
 Best Male Act – 2008 (nominated)

MUZ-TV Awards
 Best Hip-Hop Artist – 2009 (nominated)
 Best Hip-Hop Artist – 2010 (won)
 Best Album "The Boss" – 2010 (won)
 Best Video "Love You" – 2010 (won)
 Best Video "I'm on You" – 2011 (won)

MTV Europe Music Awards
 Best Russian Act – 2009 (nominated)
 Best Russian Act – 2010 (nominated)
 Best Russian Act – 2011 (nominated)

Golden Gramophone Award
 Award winner for the "I love you..." song – 2008
 Award winner for the "Moscow Never Sleeps..." song − 2009
 Award winner for the "London" song (together with Grigory Leps) − 2013

Night Life Awards
 Best club hit – 2003
 Best club figure of the year − 2007

World Fashion Awards
 Best R'n'B artist – 2007
 Fashion R'n'B project − 2008

Other awards
 2008 − MTV RMA Award (Best club project for the Black Star Club)
 2009 − In Da Awards (Best album according to Indarnb.ru)
 2010 − Love Radio Awards (Best artist according to Love Radio)
 2010 − "Trud" newspaper award - (Best-looking man)
 2014 − World Music Awards (Best Russian Artist and Best RnB Artist of Russia)

Other achievements 
His 2019 pro-Kremlin and anti-gay music video "Moscow" became the most disliked Russian video on YouTube, with 1.48 million dislikes before it was removed from YouTube.

During the 2022 Russian invasion of Ukraine, he argued in favor of the Russian attack.

Filmography
2004 − Countdown
2006 − Heat
2008 − Albania!
2008 − Monday Twist
2008 − Daddy's Daughters
2008 − Hitler Goes Kaput!
2009 − Little Red Riding Hood
2010 − How the Cossacks...
2012 − My path to success (a videoseminar)
2013 − Odnoklassniki.ru
2014 - Capsule
2015 − Zero
2016 − Russian Hip Hop Beef
2019 − Hot!
2019 − Mafia
2020 − Mafia 2

Translation dubbing:
2006 − Arthur and the Invisibles
2007 − Surf's Up
2009 − District 13: Ultimatum
2009 − Arthur and the Revenge of Maltazard
2014 − Brick Mansions

Personal life 
Timati was in a relationship with Alexa – his colleague from the “Fabrika Zvyozd” – a popular Russian television talent show. The pair split up in 2007.

He was also in a relationship with model Alena Shishkova. They share a daughter named Alisa (born 19 March 2014).

Since 2015, Timati has been dating Russian model Anastasia Reshetova.  On October 16, 2019, the couple had a son, named Ratmir.

See also 
 MD&C Pavlov

References

External links

 
Timati at the Forbes

Timati lyrics 

1983 births
Russian hip hop
Russian hip hop musicians
Living people
English-language singers from Russia
Volga Tatar people
Jewish rappers
Rappers from Moscow
Russian Jews
Fabrika Zvyozd
Tatar people of Russia
Jewish hip hop record producers
Russian record producers
Universal Motown Records artists
Russian people of Jewish descent